Krishna is a 1996 Indian action film directed by Deepak Shivdasani, starring Sunil Shetty, Karishma Kapoor, Om Puri, Shakti Kapoor, Tinnu Anand and Kulbhushan Kharbanda. The film was an average grosser at the box office. The music of the film was also popular with hit songs such as "Jhanjariya". The film was mostly a remake of Deep Cover (1992) starring Lawrence "Larry" Fishburne and Jeff Goldblum. It was also inspired on Jeetendra and Hema Malini film Meri Aawaz Suno (1981) which itself was a remake of a Kannada film Antha (1981).

Plot 

Krishna (Sunil Shetty) is a new name in the world of crime, whose exploits attract the attention of Raja (Shakti Kapoor), an heir to a dead underworld don. Raja is just reduced to remain at the mercy of Bhujang Rao, aka Bhau (Mohan Joshi), another don. Raja loathes Bhujang and his attitude and extends a hand to Krishna, who accepts the offer. Bhau tries to convince Krishna of a brighter future if he joins Bhau's gang, but Krishna remains with Raja. Meanwhile, Rashmi (Karisma Kapoor), a club dancer, is lamenting the loss of Sunil, her love. Sunil, who was Krishna's lookalike, was a pilot who died during his training session. Rashmi refuses to believe so, hoping that Sunil will return.

During a gig, Rashmi runs into Krishna and is thrilled to see him. Krishna tells her firmly that he is not Sunil. Only when she sees that a tattoo bearing Rashmi's name, which was supposed to be on Sunil's arm, is missing from Krishna's arm, she leaves, broken-hearted and dejected. However, some goons try to rape her and she is saved by Krishna. Krishna reveals that he is indeed Sunil and goes on, to tell the truth. He reveals that his instructor was actually acting as a link for some criminals. He forced Sunil to land at an abandoned place to meet the criminals.

One of the criminals was Cobra (Tinnu Anand), an infamous name in the underworld. The deal went wrong and Sunil's instructor was killed. Sunil survived somehow and nobody had seen his face. He was wrongfully arrested as a suspect and minister Amar Prabhakar (Om Puri) bailed him out. Amar told him that if he wants to survive, he has to take down all the people who could pose a possible threat. So, Sunil got booked under another name – Krishna. Meanwhile, Cobra returns to India again. It is revealed that both Bhau and Raja are on his payroll. Cobra decides to make Raja the de facto ruler of his operations in India. Raja tells him about Krishna.

Cobra and Sunil meet, where Cobra suspects that he has seen Krishna somewhere else. Sunil knows that Cobra may recognize him, but now he has come too far. Later, Raja drops by a brothel, where Sunil is surprised to see his sister perform. His sister is shocked to see him too and commits suicide on the spot. Sunil learns from another dancer that most of the dancers have the same story to share – a man came in their life pretending to be a well to do person, married them, and sold them, where they were raped before ending up here. He realizes that the man whom he gave his sister to is responsible for the destruction of so many girl's lives.

The dancer also tells him that he keeps a record, mostly videotapes of the people he has sold the girls to, in order to blackmail them. In a fit of rage, Sunil accosts the man, but he dies. Sunil receives another blow when he learns that his mother has died. Amar keeps the truths under wraps and gives Sunil's mother the funeral she deserved. Sunil also learns that Amar's own daughter has been kidnapped and that Cobra has the tape which may uncover the identity of his sister's rapist. On learning of Cobra's other deal with Bhau and Raja, Sunil decides to end it all. In bloody aftermath, the criminals are killed.

Sunil finds the tape, whereby he receives a shocker that his sister was raped by none other than Amar. Here, it is revealed that Amar's daughter is not kidnapped; it was only a ploy to garner public sympathy for the next elections. However, the Commissioner (Kulbhushan Kharbanda) learns of this fraud and Amar has him captured. The next day, Amar is giving a speech when an enraged Sunil turns up. He makes his way to Amar. The Commissioner, who has somehow succeeded in escaping, manages to save Sunil from being taken down. He pleads to Sunil to let the police take over. Amar tries to run away, taking advantage of the situation, but Sunil removes a fake Sudarshan Chakra from an idol of Lord Krishna and beheads Amar with it. With Amar dead, Sunil surrenders.

Cast 
Suniel Shetty as Krishna / Sunil
Karishma Kapoor as Rashmi
Om Puri as Amar Prabhakar
Shakti Kapoor as Raja
Mohan Joshi as Bhujang Rao / aka Bhau
Tinu Anand as Cobra
Kulbhushan Kharbanda as DCP Khanna
Rohini Hattangadi as Sunil's mother
Eva Grover as Sudha, Sunil's sister
Vinay Sapru as Karan, Sudha's Fraud husband. 
Lalit Tiwari as Sunil's Instructor
Deep Dhillon as Ranga, Sharpshooter
Ishrat Ali as Police Inspector Khote
Virendra Saxena as Police Inspector Inamdar
Mushtaq Khan as Popat / Phukat
Shiva Rindani as Safed Ghoda / Pandu
Amit Singh as Don Vishwa
Vipin Sharma as Panditji

Soundtrack 
All songs composed by Anu Malik, with lyrics by Nida Fazli, Anwar Sagar, Anand Raaj Anand, and Madan Pal. "Jhanjariya" song was re-adapted from Anand Raaj Anand's "Babu Tips Music" album.

References

External links 
 

1990s Hindi-language films
1996 films
Films scored by Anu Malik
Indian action thriller films
1996 action films
Films directed by Deepak Shivdasani
Indian remakes of American films